New York's 7th State Assembly district is one of the 150 districts in the New York State Assembly. It has been represented by Republican Jarett Gandolfo since 2021, replacing Andrew Garbarino.

Geography
District 7 is in Suffolk County. It includes portions of the towns of Islip and Brookhaven, including the villages of Brightwaters, and Patchogue, as well as the hamlets of Bay Shore, Great River, Oakdale, Bohemia, West Sayville, Sayville, Bayport, Blue Point, and East Patchogue.

Recent election results

2022

2020

2018

2016

2014

2012

References

7
Suffolk County, New York